The Baker Municipal Natatorium, located in Baker City, Oregon, is listed on the National Register of Historic Places. Baker Heritage Museum, previously the Oregon Trail Regional Museum, is now housed in this building.

See also
 National Register of Historic Places listings in Baker County, Oregon

References

External links
 Baker Heritage Museum
 National Register of Historic Places - Photos and Nomination Form
 "Baker+Municipal+Natatorium" American Lumberman Article 1921
 The WPA Guide to Oregon: The Beaver State
 Waymarking page
 Airstream event

1920 establishments in Oregon
Buildings and structures completed in 1920
Buildings and structures in Baker City, Oregon
Government buildings on the National Register of Historic Places in Oregon
National Register of Historic Places in Baker County, Oregon